Dangerous Blondes is a 1943 American comedy film directed by Leigh Jason and written by Richard Flournoy and Jack Henley, from the story If the Shroud Fits by Kelley Roos.The film stars Allyn Joslyn and Evelyn Keyes, and was released by Columbia Pictures in September 1943. Alternate titles for this film were Reckless Lady and The Case of the Dangerous Blondes. A review in Vanity Fair review characterized the film as a "laugh-packed session here via the antics of Allyn Joslyn and Evelyn Keyes."

Plot
Barry Craig (Allyn Joslyn), a crime fiction writer, and his wife Jane (Evelyn Keyes) are approached by Jane's friend, Julie Taylor (Anita Louise). Julie works for fashion photographer Ralph McCormick (Edmund Lowe), and she believes the studio is being stalked by a murderer. Soon after, a wealthy socialite, Isabel Fleming (Mary Forbes), is murdered during a photo session. The police become involved and the investigation takes its course.

Cast

References

External links
 
 
  still photos

1943 films
American black-and-white films
Films directed by Leigh Jason
1943 comedy films
American comedy films
Columbia Pictures films
1940s English-language films
1940s American films